Nicholas Brown Sr. (July 26, 1729 – May 29, 1791) was an American slave trader and merchant who was a co-signer of the founding charter of the College of Rhode Island in 1763.  In 1771, Nicholas Brown Sr. was instrumental in convincing Baptist authorities to locate a permanent home for the College in his hometown of Providence.  In 1804, the College was renamed Brown University following a gift made by Brown's son Nicholas Brown Jr.

Biography
Born in 1729, the second child of James Brown II (1698–1739) and Hope Power Brown (1702–1792), Nicholas Brown Sr. was apprenticed to his uncle Obadiah Brown (1712–1762) from the age of 16.  Just before his 21st birthday, his older brother Captain James Brown (1724–1750) died at sea.  Nicholas took his role as head of the family very seriously, delaying his marriage to Rhoda Jenckes (1741–1783) until he was 33 years old. Following the death of his uncle Obadiah, the family business conglomerate that included maritime trade along the Eastern Seaboard, with the Caribbean and with England; a rum distillery; spermaceti candle manufacturing; an iron foundry (the Hope Furnace); and a network of shops, was renamed Nicholas Brown & Co. Until 1771, Brown worked in partnership with his three younger brothers Joseph (1733–1785), John (1736–1803), and Moses (1738–1836), who were known in Rhode Island annals as the "Four Brothers."  Thereafter, the brothers continued to collaborate on ventures but were no longer partners.

Brown served in the Rhode Island Legislature and became a civic leader, funding or fundraising for the paving of Providence streets, a library, a market house, the College of Rhode Island's first building, the First Baptist Church, a fire engine and other civic improvements.  During the Revolution, he speculated in war bonds, supplied the Continental Army with gunpowder and foodstuffs, transformed the Hope Furnace into cannon works, and funded several privateering ventures.  During the post-war "critical period," Brown was a leader of the Federalist faction in Rhode Island that opposed paper money and supported ratifying the U.S. Constitution.

Shortly after taking over the family business, Brown ordered a nine-and-a half foot mahogany desk-and-bookcase crafted by Daniel Spencer, who was the nephew of John Goddard. It was sold for his descendant, Nicholas Brown VI by Christie's Auctioneers on June 3, 1989 for $12,100,000, the highest price ever paid for a piece of decorative art at that date, to fund the restoration of the Nightingale-Brown House, which today is the John Nicholas Brown Center for Public Humanities and Cultural Heritage at Brown University. The desk-and-bookcase currently resides in a Private Collection.

Following Rhoda Brown's death in 1783, Brown remarried Avis Binney (1749–1807).  He fathered ten children with Rhoda and one with Avis, of which only two survived: a son Nicholas Brown Jr. (1769–1841) and a daughter, Hope (1773–1855) who married Thomas Poynton Ives (1769–1835).  When Brown died in 1791, the Rev. Dr. Stillman of Boston gave a eulogy:
He was the affectionate husband, the tender father, the compassionate master, the dutiful son, the loving brother, and the steady, faithful friend. He took much pains, by reading and by conversation, to inform his mind, and had acquired much general knowledge. But religion was his favorite subject. To Christianity in general, as founded on a fulness of evidence, and to its peculiar doctrines, he was firmly attached. * * * He was a Baptist from principle, and a lover of good men of all denominations. Blessed with opulence, he was ready to distribute to public and private uses. In his death the college in this place, this church and society, the town of Providence, and the general interests of religion, learning, and liberality have lost a friend indeed.The History of the State of Rhode Island and Providence Plantations: Biographical, Volume 6, by the American Historical Society, Inc., 1920.  Pages 188 - 191 http://www.rootsweb.ancestry.com/~rigenweb/article3.html

Controversy
As head of the family business, Nicholas Brown Sr. made a number of controversial decisions regarding smuggling, attempting to corner the tobacco market in Surinam, rigging elections, and most notably attempting a slave trading voyage in 1764 to fund his new iron foundry.  The disastrous 1764 voyage of the "Sally" is described in detail in the final report of Brown University's Steering Committee on Slavery and Justice. Thereafter, Brown never again attempted slave trading and ensured his son was mentored by George Benson, an ardent abolitionist.

References

External links

 Encyclopedia Brunoniana
 Brown University Charter
Report of the Brown University Steering Committee on Slavery and Justice

 

1729 births
1791 deaths
Brown University people
People of colonial Rhode Island
University and college founders
Nicholas Brown Sr.
Baptists from Rhode Island
American slave traders
People from Providence, Rhode Island
Colonial American merchants